Mam Cymru may refer to:

 16th century Welsh noblewoman Katheryn of Berain also known as Katheryn Tudor.
 National personification of Wales, also called Dame Wales used in cartoons, most notably by Joseph Morewood Staniforth.
 Isle of Anglesey.